Ditiola is a genus of fungi within the family Dacrymycetaceae. The genus contains about 10 widely distributed species. Ditiola was circumscribed by Elias Fries in 1822.

References

External links

Dacrymycetes